Momo was the lead ship of her class of four destroyers built for the Imperial Japanese Navy during World War I. Completed in 1916, the ship was sent to the Mediterranean Sea where she served as a convoy escort. Momo was decommissioned on 1 April 1940 and subsequently scrapped.

Design and description
The Momo-class destroyers were enlarged and faster versions of the preceding  with a more powerful armament. The Momos were powered by two Brown-Curtis geared steam turbines, each driving one shaft using steam produced by four Kampon water-tube boilers. Two boilers burned a mixture of coal and fuel oil while the other pair only used oil. Their crew consisted of 110 officers and ratings.

The main armament of the Momo-class ships consisted of three quick-firing (QF)  guns; one gun each was located at the bow and stern with the third gun positioned between the funnels. Their torpedo armament consisted of two triple rotating mounts for  torpedoes located fore and aft of the funnels.

Construction and career
Momo was launched on 12 October 1916 at the Sasebo Naval Arsenal and completed on 23 December. The ship played a minor role in World War I and participated in the 1937 Battle of Shanghai that began the Second Sino-Japanese War. She was decommissioned on 1 April 1940 and subsequently broken up.

References

Bibliography

 

1916 ships
Ships built by Sasebo Naval Arsenal
Naval ships of Manchukuo
Momo-class destroyers